Amit, Pollak, Matalon & Co. is one of the largest law firms in Israel. Its offices are located in Tel Aviv. The firm was founded in 1956 by Nahum Amit.

The firm offers services in all areas of corporate and commercial law to Israeli and international clients from across all business sectors. APM & Co. represents enterprises, including banking institutions, insurance companies, real estate developers and contractors, venture capital funds, software houses, high-tech companies and trade unions. The firm's clientele also includes mutual fund managers, stock-brokers and provident funds.

Areas of business
The firm is active in all areas of corporate and commercial law including, finance, antitrust, high-tech, venture capital and private equity, intellectual property, capital markets, public and private offerings and securities, real estate, cooperative societies, bankruptcy, liquidation and reorganization, litigation, dispute resolution and class actions, taxation, labor and employment, regulatory and compliance, infrastructure, environmental projects, and energy.

References

External links 
 APM & Co. at BDICode
 APM & Co. at Duns100
 APM & Co. at EMEA Legal 500

Law firms of Israel
Law firms established in 1956